Bavian (also Romanized as Bavīān) is a village in Qalkhani Rural District, Gahvareh District, Dalahu County, Kermanshah Province, Iran. At the 2006 census,                                          its population was 229, in 46 families.

References 

Populated places in Dalahu County